Binaca may refer to:
 Binaca Geetmala, a weekly radio show
 Binaca, Upi, an inactive volcano in Aguindanao province, Philippines
 Binaca (breath spray), a brand of breath spray
 Binaca (brand), a toothpaste brand in India